Blacksville is a Incorporated Town in Monongalia County, West Virginia, United States. The population was 118 at the 2020 census. It is included in the Morgantown, West Virginia Metropolitan Statistical Area.

The Town of Blacksville has a C1 Census Class Code which indicates an active incorporated place that does not serve as a county subdivision equivalent. It also has a Functional Status Code of "A" which identifies an active government providing primary general-purpose functions.

History 
The Town is named after David Black. A civil engineer from Virginia who came to the area in 1800. Black was eventually was able to secure 100 acres of land from Brice Worley for $50. Black then requested a patent in the summer of 1829, to lay out 160 acres of his land and sell plots in a move similar to creating a subdivision today. On February 3, 1830 the General Assembly of Virginia passed an act, establishing the town as a Municipal Corporation and naming it Blacksville. During the American Civil War, Blacksville became an unincorporated community on June 20, 1863. With the creation of the U.S. State of West Virginia. The West Virginia Legislature then re-incorporated the town in October 1897.

Geography
Blacksville is located at  (39.720036, -80.212562).

Demographics

2010 census
At the 2010 census there were 171 people, 69 households, and 46 families living in the town. The racial makeup of the town was 97.1% White and 2.9% from two or more races.
Of the 69 households 30.4% had children under the age of 18 living with them, 44.9% were married couples living together, 14.5% had a female householder with no husband present, 7.2% had a male householder with no wife present, and 33.3% were non-families. 24.6% of households were one person and 8.7% were one person aged 65 or older. The average household size was 2.48 and the average family size was 3.00.

The median age in the town was 35.2 years. 25.1% of residents were under the age of 18; 8.2% were between the ages of 18 and 24; 28.1% were from 25 to 44; 26.4% were from 45 to 64; and 12.3% were 65 or older. The gender makeup of the town was 51.5% male and 48.5% female.

2000 census
At the 2000 census there were 175 people, 69 households, and 50 families living in the town. The population density was 576.2 inhabitants per square mile (225.2/km). There were 84 housing units at an average density of 276.6 per square mile (108.1/km).  The racial makeup of the town was 100.00% White.
Of the 69 households 40.6% had children under the age of 18 living with them, 42.0% were married couples living together, 23.2% had a female householder with no husband present, and 27.5% were non-families. 23.2% of households were one person and 14.5% were one person aged 65 or older. The average household size was 2.54 and the average family size was 2.98.

The age distribution was 30.9% under the age of 18, 9.1% from 18 to 24, 26.9% from 25 to 44, 18.9% from 45 to 64, and 14.3% 65 or older. The median age was 34 years. For every 100 females, there were 82.3 males. For every 100 females age 18 and over, there were 75.4 males.

The median household income was $31,250 and the median family income  was $36,875. Males had a median income of $29,167 versus $16,667 for females. The per capita income for the town was $13,461. About 12.5% of families and 17.0% of the population were below the poverty line, including 21.7% of those under the age of eighteen and 11.1% of those sixty five or over.

Education
Monongalia County Schools serves Blacksville. Zoned schools include Mason Dixon Elementary School, and Clay-Battelle Middle/High School.

Blacksville pottery
During the mid 20th century, Blacksville was well known for its pottery, made by local residents using native clay.  Edgar Richardson (b. Jollytown, PA 1903 - d. 1962)  taught pottery at Clay-Battelle high school and his beautiful pieces, signed "E.R. - Blacksville,"  are still being auctioned and collected.  First Lady Eleanor Roosevelt visited Blacksville on June 28, 1938 to learn more about the "Blacksville pottery project."

See also

 List of towns in West Virginia

References

External links

Towns in Monongalia County, West Virginia
Towns in West Virginia
Morgantown metropolitan area